Diego Hernán Morales (born 16 April 1983) is an Argentine footballer who plays as a goalkeeper for Alianza Universidad in the Peruvian Primera División.

Having been part of the Argentinos Juniors squad since 2004 as a reserve goalkeeper, Morales made his league debut in a 1-1 draw against Godoy Cruz on 8 November 2008, as the team's first choice goalkeeper Sebastián Torrico was unavailable.

References

External links 
  
 
 

1983 births
Living people
Footballers from Buenos Aires
Argentine footballers
Association football goalkeepers
Argentinos Juniors footballers
Quilmes Atlético Club footballers
Juan Aurich footballers
Sport Boys footballers
Club Deportivo Universidad César Vallejo footballers
Cienciano footballers
Real Garcilaso footballers
Argentine expatriate footballers
Expatriate footballers in Peru